Dipleurula is a hypothetical larva of the ancestral echinoderm.  It represents the type of basis of all larva forms of, at least, the eleutherozoans (all echinoderms except crinoids), where the starfish, sea urchins, sea cucumbers and brittle stars belong. The dipleurula is a bilaterally symmetrical, ciliated echinoderm larva (cilia devoted to movement, feeding and perception).

Dipleurula may represent an ancestral form for primitive ambulacrarians (and possibly even deuterostomes).

We can see that all well-known forms of larvae of echinoderms are derived from the hypothetical dipleurula.  Among them fall the bipinnaria and the brachiolaria of the starfish, the auricularia of the sea cucumbers and the pluteus larvae of the sea urchins, and the sand stars. Also the doliolaria of the crinoids (sea-lilies and feather stars) can be attributed to the same basic pattern, even if they do not have a mouth opening.

References

External links 
  Information on forn
 

Larvae
Echinoderm biology